Rosaura Zapata (1876? – July 23, 1963) was a Mexican educator who helped to found the national system of education. She received Mexico's highest national honor when the Belisario Domínguez Medal of Honor was inaugurated in 1954.

External links
 Bio details, Instituto Nacional de las Mujeres – in Spanish
 Bio details, Red Escolar – in Spanish
 History of preschool education in Mexico, UNAM – in Spanish

References

Mexican educators
1870s births
1963 deaths
Recipients of the Belisario Domínguez Medal of Honor
20th-century Mexican educators